William P. "Plunk" Drake (June 8, 1895 – October 30, 1977) was a Negro league baseball pitcher.

Drake pitched for top Negro league teams between 1920 and 1927, primarily remembered for his time with the Kansas City Monarchs, participating in two Colored World Series in 1924 and 1925. He gained his nickname from his propensity for pitching inside to batters and his willingness to hit batters who crowded the plate.  He claimed to have taught Satchel Paige his famous hesitation pitch, though credit is usually given to Bill Gatewood.

References
Notes

Sources

 University of Missouri-St Louis Negro Baseball Project: Oral History Interview with Bill Drake

External links

 and Baseball-Reference Black Baseball stats and Seamheads

1895 births
1977 deaths
All Nations players
Detroit Stars players
Indianapolis ABCs players
Kansas City Monarchs players
St. Louis Giants players
Baseball players from Missouri
Sportspeople from Sedalia, Missouri
Baseball pitchers
20th-century African-American sportspeople